The Mark Gordon Company (formerly The Meledandri/Gordon Company) is an American production company owned by Mark Gordon. It is notable for their output, including feature films, like Speed, many of Roland Emmerich's films Gordon produced like The Day After Tomorrow, 10,000 B.C. and 2012, and TV shows like Grey's Anatomy, Criminal Minds, The Rookie and Ray Donovan.

History

Original era (1987-1995) 
In 1987, film producers Mark Gordon and Chris Meledandri, who later go on to found Illumination Entertainment, formed The Meledandri/Gordon Company, with a non-exclusive deal with Paramount Pictures. Meledandri quit in 1991 to join Dawn Steel's production company, and it was renamed to The Mark Gordon Company.

Its big break came in 1994 when Gordon made its first success with its film Speed, which grossed $350.4 million at the box office.

Their second big success from Gordon was the 1996 film Broken Arrow, which grossed $150.2 million at the box office.

On December 10, 1995, Gordon merged its own company with Gary Levinson's Classico Entertainment, which ultimately signed a deal with Paramount Pictures after its deal with Fox ends. It was at first known as Cloud Nine Entertainment, before settling on Mutual Film Company.

Second era (2000-2015) 
On September 7, 2000, it was announced that Mark Gordon is quitting Mutual Film Company in order to relaunch its own company. A year later, on October 10, 2001, it signed a deal with 20th Century Fox to produce new films under its own production company and hired Betsy Beers to run the company.

In 2002, Gordon partnered with Bob Yari to launch Stratus Film Company, to produce independent feature films, and hired Mark Gill as executive of the studio. Gordon exited the organization in 2005.

In 2003, Gordon signed a deal with Columbia Pictures to produce its feature films for a three-year pact.

In 2004, Mark Gordon was producing its first TV series LAX for NBC, which came from the studio. On August 18, 2004, Gordon signed a deal with Touchstone Television for two years, where the studio is developing drama projects.

That same year, The Day After Tomorrow became the studio's first hit under the new era, and it grossed $552.6 million worldwide.

In 2005, Gordon made his first big success on TV with the Shonda Rhimes-created series Grey's Anatomy. The studio followed up his success with Criminal Minds, which aired on CBS.

In 2007, its own pact with ABC Studios was renewed. Four years later, in 2011, it signed a production deal with The Walt Disney Studios, whereas Gordon is running the company for four years until 2015.

Entertainment One era (2015-2018) 
In 2015, Entertainment One acquired its 51% stake in The Mark Gordon Company. eOne will handle international sales of its productions developed by The Mark Gordon Company. In 2016, Gordon launched its first two independent shows under eOne's regime, including Designated Survivor and Conviction, all of them were co-produced with ABC Studios and aired on the ABC network.

In 2018, Entertainment One acquired the remaining 49% of the company and it folded The Mark Gordon Company into the parent company, by making Gordon president of it.

Third era (2019-present) 
On July 25, 2019, Mark Gordon announced that he will step down as Entertainment One president, in order to relaunch his own independent studio, with its own first-look deal with the studio eOne.

Productions

Theatrical/direct-to-video films

Television shows

Television movies/pilots/specials

References

External links 
 The Mark Gordon Company on IMDb
 Mark Gordon Productions on IMDb

Entertainment companies established in 1987
Film production companies of the United States
Television production companies of the United States
1987 establishments in California
Re-established companies
1995 disestablishments in California
Entertainment companies based in California
2000 establishments in California
2018 disestablishments in California
2019 establishments in California
Entertainment companies established in 2000
Entertainment companies established in 2019